Cristina Junqueira is a Brazilian banking executive and one of the founders of Nubank, a financial technology company. She is Brazil's second self-made woman billionaire.

Early life and education 
Born in Ribeirão Preto in São Paulo, Brazil, Junqueira moved to Rio de Janeiro as an infant. Intending to  study industrial engineering, Junqueira attended the Universidade de São Paulo. Upon graduating, she accepted the role of an associate consultant at the Boston Consulting Group. As she worked, Junqueira obtained her master's degree in economic and financial modeling at the same college. Shortly after this, in 2007, she attended the Kellogg School of Management at Northwestern University in Chicago, Illinois, where she earned her MBA.

Career
After obtaining her MBA, Junqueira returned to Brazil and worked as the head of the small-and-medium-sized enterprises sector at Unibanco, the largest private banking group in the country. The next year, a merger took place between Unibanco and Itaú, the second-largest private banking group in Brazil, and Junqueira was offered the position of portfolio manager. Junqueira later resigned from the company. She also worked at LuizaCred, the financial services unit of Brazilian retailer Magazine Luiza.

Nubank 
The idea behind Nubank was inspired soon after Junqueira realized that she was only "making the rich richer". She was introduced to David Vélez, who had experience as a venture capitalist under Sequoia Capital. He also had growing frustrations in regards to Brazil's banking system. With their shared frustrations in mind, Junqueira and Vélez decided to partner together and begin a digital banking venture.

Junqueira and Vélez decided upon “Nubank” as the name to represent their venture. In addition to “nu” phonetically sounding similar to the word “new”, it means “nude” in Portuguese. This is representative of the founders' values in creating a transparent firm.

Nubank filed for an IPO in December 2021 and became publicly traded on the New York Stock Exchange.

Personal life 
Junqueira is married and has three children.

References 

Kellogg School of Management alumni
Year of birth missing (living people)
Living people
Brazilian business executives
Brazilian bankers